Clymer District School No. 5, also known as the Little Red Schoolhouse, is a historic one-room school building located at Clymer in Chautauqua County, New York.  It was designed and built about 1853 in the vernacular Greek Revival-style.

It was listed on the National Register of Historic Places in 1994 in the United States.

References

External links
History of Clymer

School buildings on the National Register of Historic Places in New York (state)
School buildings completed in 1853
One-room schoolhouses in New York (state)
Schoolhouses in the United States
Buildings and structures in Chautauqua County, New York
National Register of Historic Places in Chautauqua County, New York